Nanjing University Medical School (NUMS or sometimes NMS, Chinese：南京大學醫學院, Hanyu Pinyin: Nánjīng Dàxué Yīxuéyuàn, colloquially 南大醫學院, Nándà Yīxuéyuàn), the Medical School of Nanjing University, is one of the major practical and professional schools of Nanjing University. The division of basic medicine is located in Xianlin campus, and division of clinical medicine in Gulou campus which is located in the centre of Nanjing.

Different from most current other university medical schools in mainland China, it is not a merge of a medical university, and it is relatively small.

History 
Nanjing University has years of history in medical education and research or related to medical service. The first public school of medicine, the imperial central Medical School (醫學), was established in Nanking by Chin Chung Tsu (秦承祖), in the 20th year of Yuanjia reign of Song of Southern dynasties (CE 443), and when other specialized imperial schools merged to form the comprehensive imperial university in Nanking in the 6th year of Taishi (CE 470), it kept independent. The Imperial Medical Institute (太醫院) in Ming dynasty was also not part of the imperial university, although in some periods of Chinese history imperial medical institute was part of imperial university. On the other hand, some faculty members of the imperial university are experts in medicine, e.g., Hu Ying (胡濙), president of Nanking Imperial University, has several works in medicine, and besides officials, some graduates of ancient Nanking University became teachers (先生, 老師), advisers (幕僚, 師爺), lawyers (法家, 訟師), etc., as well as doctors (大夫, 醫師). And in Ming dynasty there was a university hospital with more than one hundred rooms.

Nanjing University founded medical school in Shanghai in 1927 in the era of Republic of China, with medical preparatory education in Nanjing, merging Jiangsu Medical University which originated in 1912 in Suzhou, and the school renamed Medical College of National Central University in 1928. It is the first modern national university medical school in China. The first dean was Yan Fuqing (顏福慶). Chinese first degree of Doctor of Medicine was awarded in 1931 by the school. The Medical College of National Central University became independent National Shanghai Medical College in 1932. In 1935, National Central University established medical school again, this time in Nanjing, initially with National Central Hospital (now Nanjing General Hospital) as clinical hospital. Qi Shounan (戚壽南) was appointed its first dean. Meanwhile, National School of Dentistry (國立牙醫專科學校), the first public dental school in China, was also founded by the university. National Central University moved to Chungking while its medical school and the Department of Animal Husbandry and Veterinary Medicine of Agricultural School moved to Chengdu during Anti-Japanese war. In 1949, the Medical College of National Central University was renamed Medical College of National Nanjing University. The Nanjing University Medical College was changed to be Eastern Military Medical College in 1952, then moved to Xi'an and became the Fourth Military Medical University in 1954.

In 1987, Nanjing University reestablished medical school, and it was the only university medical school directly under the Ministry of Education in mainland China at the time. Nanjing Gulou Hospital, formerly the hospital of University of Nanking, became clinical teaching hospital. In 1994, Nanjing Stomatological Hospital became the third clinical teaching hospital of Nanjing University Medical School, after Gulou Hospital and Nanjing General Hospital, and Nanjing University Medical School established the School of Stomatology in 2009.

Composition 
Major composition of the school of medicine
 Basic medicine (Division of Basic Medicine, Nanjing University Medical School)
 Clinical medicine (Division of Clinical Medicine, Nanjing University Medical School)
 Oral medicine (School of Stomatology, Nanjing University Medical School)

Clinical teaching and research hospitals
 Nanjing Gulou Hospital (鼓樓醫院, or translated as Nanjing Drum Tower Hospital ). The Gulou Hospital is the first modern hospital of western medicine in Nanjing, established in 1892.
 Nanjing General Hospital (南总医院, 南京总医院, Nanjing General Hospital, PLA; also named 金陵医院, Jinling Hospital or Nanking Hospital). The Nanjing General Hospital was formerly the National Central Hospital (國立中央醫院), which is the first modern national hospital directly established by Ministry of Health of China, founded in 1930.
 Nanjing Stomatological Hospital  (南京口腔医院). The name of Nanjing Stomatological Hospital was adopted in 1986, and its predecessor is the Institute of Dental Treatment Services of National Central Hygiene Experiment Hospital (NCHEH later to become Chinese Academy of Medical Sciences), established in 1947.

Notes and references

External links 
Medical School of Nanjing University

Nanjing University
Medical schools in China